David Robert Gilbert (born 29 December 1960) is a former Australian cricketer who played in nine Test matches and 14 One Day Internationals (ODIs) in 1985 and 1986. He played domestically for New South Wales, Gloucestershire and Tasmania.

Gilbert received his chance at international cricket due to player bans as a result of rebel tours to South Africa. He performed reasonably well leading the attack, but did not attain distinction at the international level. He toured England, New Zealand and India with the Australian team. He also played 14 ODIs, taking 18 wickets at 30.66. He won the match award when he took 5 for 46 off 10 overs in Australia's victory over New Zealand at the Sydney Cricket Ground in January 1986.

He achieved greater success at first-class level, taking over 350 wickets. He took his best match figures of 13 for 118 for a Young Australia XI against Zimbabwe at Harare in October 1985: 7 for 43 and 6 for 75 in the Australians' 65-run victory. His best innings figures were 8 for 55 for Gloucestershire against Kent in August 1991.

Since retiring, he has served at executive levels with Surrey, Sussex and New South Wales. He was subsequently a successful coach and cricket manager for Sussex and worked as the CEO of the New South Wales Cricket Association until 14 January 2013, when he resigned.

References

External links
 

1960 births
Living people
Australia Test cricketers
Australia One Day International cricketers
Gloucestershire cricketers
Tasmania cricketers
New South Wales cricketers
Lincolnshire cricketers
Australian cricketers
Australian cricket coaches
Australian cricket administrators
Cricketers from Sydney